Harris Ranch Airport  is an airstrip near Coalinga, California, next to Interstate 5. To the north of the airport is the Harris Ranch Restaurant and Inn. The airport has been open since March 1981.

Parking and fuel are on the north end near the restaurant. On the south end of the runway is a run-up area. There is no taxiway parallel to the runway, so takeoffs on RWY32 and landings on RWY14 require back-taxi on the runway.

Uses
An average of 27 operations per day occur at Harris Ranch.  All are transient general aviation flights; no aircraft are based there. One of the most common uses of this airport is to access the Harris Ranch restaurant and/or hotel (see: $100 hamburger).

References

External links

Airports in Fresno County, California